El Pont de Suert is a town and municipality, and the capital of the comarca of Alta Ribagorça, in the province of Lleida, in Catalonia, Spain. It is located at 838 metres above sea level, on the banks of  river Noguera Ribagorçana, a tributary to the Segre. Population 2,418 (2007).

The local Ribagorçan dialect is a variant of Catalan, which has some transitional traits to Aragonese.

References

External links 
Official website
 Government data pages 

Municipalities in Alta Ribagorça
Populated places in Alta Ribagorça